Peter Grahame Browne (15 July 1924 – 11 September 2000) was an Australian Federal politician. Born in Sydney, he enlisted in 1940 and served with the 2nd AIF as a Gunner in the 14th Heavy Anti-aircraft Battery in Darwin during the Bombing of Darwin from February 1942. In 1943 he transferred to the RAAF to undertake pilot training through the Empire Air Training Scheme, initially at 2 Initial Training School (2 I.T.S.) Bradfield Park, Sydney. He was medically discharged from the RAAF after suffering from mastoiditis.

Not yet satisfied with his contribution to the war, Browne signed-up with the US Army Small Ships Section in June 1944 where he served on ships directly supporting the Philippines Campaign, particularly the Battle of Leyte Gulf and Invasion of Lingayen Gulf. In addition to his WW2 Australian Service and Campaign medals, he was awarded US Service Medals, including the Asiatic–Pacific Campaign Medal with Campaign Stars for the Battle of Leyte and the Battle of Luzon and the Philippines Liberation Medal.

After the war Browne became a drover and horse breaker, as well as an organiser for the Liberal Party. In 1958, he was elected to the Australian House of Representatives as the Liberal member for Kalgoorlie. He held the seat until his defeat in 1961. He then served as the Principal Private Secretary to the Treasurer, Harold Holt, in the Menzies government.

Browne died in Fremantle in 2000 and was remembered in the House of Representatives. He is survived by his wife, Margaret, and three children, Rosemary, Stephen and Peter.

References

Liberal Party of Australia members of the Parliament of Australia
Members of the Australian House of Representatives for Kalgoorlie
Members of the Australian House of Representatives
1924 births
2000 deaths
20th-century Australian politicians
Australian Army personnel of World War II
Australian Army soldiers
Royal Australian Air Force personnel of World War II
United States Army personnel of World War II
United States Army civilians